Captain (then Chief Officer) George Preston Stronach GC (14 April 1912 – 12 December 1999) of the Merchant navy was awarded the George Cross for the heroism he displayed in a rescue at sea in Tripoli Harbour on 19 March 1943. Notice of his award appeared in the London Gazette on 23 November 1943.

19 March 1943
On 19 March 1943, Captain Duncan MacKellar's merchant vessel, the SS Ocean Voyager, while in Tripoli Harbour was attacked by German Ju 88 aircraft equipped with Motobomba FFF torpedoes. The ship's large consignment of petrol and ammunition caught fire.

As the captain had died in the attack, Stronach took command of the stricken vessel after being briefly knocked out by the explosions. He sought and found surviving crew members and led them to a lifeboat, then lowered another boat to search for more survivors.

He doused himself with water from a hose to protect himself as best he could from the flames engulfing the ship, climbed into the wrecked accommodation quarters and rescued a badly burned deck officer. He returned yet again to rescue another man, dragging him through a porthole, along the deck and lowering him over the side to safety.

Ordering a crewman to take the boat and injured men to safety he once again returned to the ship where he discovered another injured officer amidships and lowered him to a rescue raft which had managed to get alongside in answer to his calls for assistance. He finally saved yet another crew member, lying unconscious in the scuppers, before abandoning ship. In all he spent an hour and twenty minutes scouring the doomed vessel for survivors in the full knowledge that it could explode at any moment.

George Cross citation
Notice of Stronach's George Cross appeared in the London Gazette on 23 November 1943:

These awards are held onboard HQS Wellington, berthed on the Victoria Embankment in London.

Sources

British recipients of the George Cross
British Merchant Navy personnel of World War II
British Merchant Navy officers
1912 births
1999 deaths